Jackie Chandiru is a Ugandan musician popularly known by the polynym "Queen Of The Nile". She was the lead member of the girl music group Blu*3, based in Kampala, Uganda's capital and largest city. In 2014, she was a featured artist in "Coke Studio Africa".

Early life 
Jackie was born at Nsambya Hospital, on 13 September 1984,  to Felix Eyaa and Josephine Eyaa. Her father traces his ancestry to Kijomoro Village in present day Maracha District. Her mother Josephine Eyaa is a Muganda from Buganda. Miss Josephine lived two decades in London, United Kingdom. (Report - Bryan Morel Publications)

Education Background
Jackie Chandiru attended Lugogo Nursery School and Nakasero Primary School for her elementary schooling. She studied at Nabisunsa Girls' Secondary School for her O-Level studies and at Vienna Collage International, a private, boarding school in Kira Municipality. She studied Industrial Fine Art, at Makerere University, graduating with the degree of Bachelor of Arts in Industrial Fine Art.

Earlier while in primary school, Chandiru was an athlete, goalkeeper and captain of the school football team. While at Nabisunsa, she was the president of the schoolâ€™s drama club, as well as a member of the schoolâ€™s under-16 badminton team.

Career
In 2002, at the age of 18, Jackie Chandiru joined the Coca-Cola Pop Star Competition on a whim. She was surprised when she won the competition, with Lilian Mbabazi and Cindy Sanyu. Jackie Chandiru had written melodies of Hitajji and Bad Gal when she was still at university. The three of them formed the music trio known as Blu*3. She found musical success with the group winning the Best Artist/Group from Uganda & Best Music Video from Uganda in the 2005 Kisima Music Awards, Video of the Year ("Hitaji") in the 2005 Pearl of Africa Music Awards. In 2007, she won in the Video of the Year category with ("Burrn") at that year's Pearl of Africa Music Awards. In 2005, Blue*3 was nominated for best East African Group in the 2005 Kora Awards. Best East African Album (Hitaji) in the 2005 Tanzania Music Awards. In 2006, Blue*3 was nominated for the Best East African video ("Frisky") in the 2006. In 2009 they were nominated for Best Group & Best Performer in that year's 2009 MTV Africa Music Awards and for the Best East African Song (Where You Are with Radio & Weasel) in the 2010 Tanzania music awards.

In 2008, after five years of working together, one of the founding members of Blu*3, Cinderella Sanyu, suddenly left the group, to launch a solo career. The remaining two group founders, Jackie Chandiru and Lilian Mbabazi, recruited a new singer, Mya Baganda, and changed the name of the group to Blu 3 without the asterisk.

In 2010 Jackie embarked on a solo career. In mid 2010, Jackie released her first single "Agassi" in both Lugbara (her native language) and English. This song earned her recognition as a solo artist and earned her an award for Best RnB single in the Diva Awards. It won the Video of the Year award in the Pearl of Africa Music Awards 2011. She released a number of hit songs, including "Gwoyagala", "Overdose", "For all time", "Bakusigula", "'Don't Call His Phone", "Gold Digger" and "Agassi". She has collaborated with "Sami" Ezra from Eritrea, Jose Chameleon and rapper Navio, "Urban Boys ". She released her first album "To Live or Die" in 2010 with songs in Lugbara and English.

In May 2014, Jackie Chandiru appointed Bryan Morel of Bryan Morel Publications as her personal aide and executive assistant.

In October 2014, Jackie Chandiru performed at Pearl Rhythm Festival at the Uganda National Theatre alongside mostly live performers, The Magic Horns, Caesar Kajura and the city blend band, Undercover Brothers Ug, Arpeggio, Charles Obina and Matata, Kabwondera Junior Raymod Parwot, and Watmon Troupe.

On 17 April 2015 Jackie Chandiru made an appearance at her Wotuuse music video premiere at Club Ambiance in Kampala in partnership with NBS TV and Tusker Lite. In attendance was Jackie’s family, Bryan Morel (her publicist), Peter Naawe (wrote the song), Director 1488 (shot and directed the video) and revellers who danced to the live performance of her songs Ikumabo, Irringwa, Gold Digger, For All Time (Featuring Sami Ezra), Wotuuse, Bad Gal (featuring Blu*3) and Omukwano.

After five years of a music break, Jackie launched a come back, released two songs "Mi Ora Ku" and "Whine It", featuring Jose Chameleon and she is doing well based on updates by Bryan Morel Publications from Nairobi Kenya.

Discography
See more of Jackie Chandiru's songs, albums, awards and nominations at Blu*3

Songs
{{columns-list|colwidth=18em|
AgassiWotuuse
Overdose
Break My Heart (featuring Coco Finger)
Champion
With MeMungu Ni Mabe
Ikumabo
Afii
Obulungi Buli Mumutima
Bakusigula
Breathe Na Na Na (featuring Mun G)Don't Call His Phone8Ladies Night (featuring Coco Finger, Ronnie Banton, DJ Shiru and AK47)KwaheriAnaligo Tai (Kalas)Ngenze Noono Iryn Namubiru ReinditionGwoyagala (featuring Rabadaba)Gold diggerShamimMalkia (featuring Syd)GwokaChimalo (featuring Zani Lady C and Flip Tyce)WalagaWhine It (featuring Jose Chameleon)Walaga (featuring Mr. Lengz)Tower Of Strength (featuring Cindy Sanyu and Lilian MbabaziMi Ora KuWoah (featuring Blu*3To Live And To DieThank You (featuring Dj Benny D)Dirty Shame (featuring Batabazi Underground)Diamond Rihanna Dub
Gold Digger Mornay MIX
Better Than Them (featuring Bennie Man and Jose Chameleon
Voom Voom (featuring A-Boy and Cindy Sanyu
Nafuunye
Young Again
Omukwano
The One (featuring Arrow Boy)
Nitakufinya (featuring Kelechi Africana)
P'aloke
Singa Nali Musajja
Quarantine
Ntijisa (featuring Mesech Ssemakula)
Love Enzita
Goin On (featuring Dr. Jose Chameleon)
Wind It Up (featuring Navio and Fidempa)
Salawo Salawo
One Time Lover (featuring AK47)
I Belong To You
Take Me Higher (featuring Waje and Isis)
Drile Imu
Real Love (featuring Vampino)
Take It Off (featuring Urban Boyz)
}}
 Albums
Hitajji 2004
Burrn 2007
Be Free 2009
To Live and To die 2010

Awards and recognition
 Video of the Year in Pearl of Africa Music Awards 2011 for Agassi.
 Best RnB Single'' in Diva awards for Agassi

References

External links 
  Jackie Chandiru the Gold Digger Sensation Is In Kenya And Damn She Looks Hot!

21st-century Ugandan women singers
Living people
1984 births
People from Maracha District
People from West Nile sub-region
Makerere University alumni
People educated at Nabisunsa Girls' Secondary School
People from Northern Region, Uganda